The Royal University of Law and Economics (RULE) is one of the oldest higher educational institutions in Cambodia.

RULE was established in 1949 as the National Institute of Law, Politics and Economics. In 2003, the institute was officially deemed a university.

Background 
RULE is the first higher education institution in Cambodia. It was founded in 1948 as the National Institute of Law, Politics and Economics. In 1957 the institute became the faculty by Royal Decree. In 2003 the Faculty of Law and Economics was reorganized as a university, under the name of Royal University of Law and Economics. Other disciplines of social and natural sciences, such as language and computer sciences have been added to the curriculum.

The university has four faculties, two graduate schools and one center, teaching law, economics and business.

Staff and students
In 2003, there were 4,800 undergraduate students studying in the four faculties, among them were 1,478 female students. Newly established graduate schools accommodate 507 graduate students. There are 84 full-time and 112 visiting Cambodian lecturers and 70 foreign lecturers who give lectures under the academic exchange programmes.

Academic programmes 
The educational term/grade level system has been divided into semesters, with eight semesters in the period of four years for bachelor's degree programme.

Undergraduate degree programmes

Faculty of Law 
 Law (in Khmer)
 Law (in English)
 Law (in Trilingual: Khmer, English and French)
 Law in Japanese
 Law in Chinese and Khmer

Faculty of Public Administration 
Bachelor's in Public Administration
Bachelor's in International Relations (English Program)

Faculty of Economics and Management 
 Bachelor in Economics
 Bachelor of Business Administration
 Bachelor in Accounting
 Bachelor in Finance and Banking

Faculty of Information Economics 
 Bachelor in Information Economics

Graduate degree programmes

Graduate School of Law 
 Master of Public Administration (MPA)
 Master in Private Law (MPL)
 Master in International Business Law and Corporate Counsel (MIB)

Graduate School of Economics and Management 
 Master of Business Administration (MBA)
 Master of Business Administration in Finance (MBA-Finance)
 Master of Business Administration in Marketing (MBA-Marketing)
 Master in Tourism Management

Notable alumni 
Veasna Chea Leth - activist and the first woman from Cambodia to graduate with a law degree.
Heng Vong Bunchhat - former dean of the faculty until 1975

See also
List of universities in Cambodia

Notes

References

Universities in Cambodia
Educational institutions established in 1948
1948 establishments in Cambodia
ASEAN University Network